Ellicott is an unincorporated community and a census-designated place (CDP) located in and governed by El Paso County, Colorado, United States. The CDP is a part of the Colorado Springs, CO Metropolitan Statistical Area. The population of the Ellicott CDP was 1,131 at the United States Census 2010. The Calhan post office (Zip Code 80808) serves the area.

Geography

Demographics

See also

Outline of Colorado
Index of Colorado-related articles
State of Colorado
Colorado cities and towns
Colorado census designated places
Colorado counties
El Paso County, Colorado
Colorado metropolitan areas
Front Range Urban Corridor
South Central Colorado Urban Area
Colorado Springs, CO Metropolitan Statistical Area

References

External links

Ellicott @ Colorado.com
Elicott School District
Ellicott, Colorado Mining Claims
El Paso County website

Census-designated places in El Paso County, Colorado
Census-designated places in Colorado